KXDM-LP (95.3 FM) is a low-power FM radio station broadcasting in a religious format. Licensed to Worland, Wyoming, US, the station is currently owned by Divine Mercy Radio.

The station broadcasts from a tower east of Worland.

References

External links

 

XDM-LP
Radio stations established in 2014
2014 establishments in Wyoming
XDM-LP
Worland, Wyoming
Catholic radio stations
Catholic Church in Wyoming